Louis III, Duke of Württemberg, (1 January 1554, in Stuttgart – 28 August 1593, in Stuttgart) was a German nobleman. He was the Duke of Württemberg, from 1568 until his death.

The only surviving son of Christoph, Duke of Württemberg, he succeeded him on his death on 28 December 1568. His reign was at first under the guardianship of his mother Anna Maria von Brandenburg-Ansbach, Duke Wolfgang von Zweibrücken and Margraves George Frederick, Margrave of Brandenburg-Ansbach and Charles II, Margrave of Baden-Durlach, in the name of Count Heinrich II zu Castell.

Marriages
Louis married twice.  On 7 November 1575, he married Dorothea Ursula (20 June 1559 – 19 May 1583), a daughter of Margrave Charles II of Baden-Durlach.  His second wife was Ursula (24 February 1572 – 5 March 1635), a daughter of Count Palatine George John I of Zweibrücken-Veldenz.  Both marriages were childless.

Ancestors

External links
 Otto von Alberti: Ludwig, Herzog von Württemberg In: Allgemeine Deutsche Biographie (ADB). Volume 19. Duncker & Humblot, Leipzig 1884, S. 597 f.

1554 births
1593 deaths
16th-century dukes of Württemberg
Soldiers of the Imperial Circles
Nobility from Stuttgart